Metallolophia is a genus of moths in the family Geometridae described by William Warren in 1895.

Species
Metallolophia albescens Inoue, 1992 (=Metallolophia ostrumaria Xue, 1992)
Metallolophia arenaria (Leech, 1889) (=Hypochroma danielaria Oberthür, 1913)
Metallolophia assamensis Orhant, 2000
Metallolophia cineracea Holloway, 1996
Metallolophia cuneataria Han & Xue, [2004]
Metallolophia devecisi Herbulot, 1989
Metallolophia flavomaculata Han & Xue, [2004]
Metallolophia inanularia Han & Xue, [2004]
Metallolophia medullosa Inoue, 1988
Metallolophia ocellata (Warren, 1897)
Metallolophia opalina (Warren, 1893)
Metallolophia purpurivenata Han & Xue, [2004]
Metallolophia stueningi Han & Xue, [2004]
Metallolophia subradiata (Warren, 1897)
Metallolophia taleensis Sondhi et al., 2020
Metallolophia variegata Holloway, 1996
Metallolophia vitticosta (Walker, 1860)

References

External links

Pseudoterpnini